David Moses Jassy, also known as Dawda, is a Gambian Swedish musician, songwriter and music producer of mixed Gambian and Estonian origin. With Andrés Avellán, he was part of a Swedish R&B hip hop duo, Navigators in the late 1990s. After split up of the group, Jassy went on to writing music and producing a number of international acts such as Ashley Tisdale, Britney Spears, Sean Kingston, Afro B, Snoh Aalegra, Arash, Eve, No Angels, Mohombi, Darin, Navigators, Charice,   Heidi Montag, Bayanni, singah, AV, Jizzle, Loreen, Petter, 1.cuz, Ant Wan and many more. He is the founder of Jassy World Entertainment, a music production and publishing company.

Early years: Navigators

David Jassy formed, with Andrés Avellán, the R&B hip hop duo, Navigators. They released first single, cover of Joyce Sims' song "Come into My Life" in 1998. In the same year they released another single called "I Remember".

In 1999 they released their third and most successful single "Superstar" that stayed 11 weeks in Swedish Singles Chart reaching number 20. In the single "Superstar", Jassy and Avellan sampled bassline from Chic's classic "I Want Your Love". In the same year their only album Daily Life Illustrators was released, reaching number 27 in the Swedish Albums Chart.

Musical production
Jassy co-wrote "Be Good to Me" and "Not Like That" from Ashley Tisdale's Headstrong and "It's Alright, It's OK" and "Crank It Up" from Tisdale's Guilty Pleasure. He also co-wrote "Goodbye to Yesterday" and "Back Off" by No Angels, "Love Struck" by VFactory", "Runaway" and "Karma" for Darin, "Body Language" for Heidi Montag and "Pyramid" for Charice.

Personal life
He was born in 1974 in Solna, Sweden to a Gambian father and an Estonian mother. He has one son born in 1997 in Sweden.

Incident and arrest

Jassy was arrested by Los Angeles police on November 23, 2008 after a confrontation with jazz musician John Osnes. Osnes was crossing the street at Selma Avenue and Schrader Boulevard. Witnesses told police that Osnes had banged on the front of Jassy's vehicle with his hands in response to Jassy's car moving into the crosswalk. Jassy got out, punched Osnes, and kicked him in the head. The coroner testified that it was either this kick or the resulting fall that broke Osnes's skull and caused his death. Jassy fled and while leaving the scene, his vehicle this time ran over Osnes. Bystanders and an off-duty Anaheim police officer tried unsuccessfully to detain Jassy. Two other off-duty police officers from Melbourne Australia were also at the scene. They tried unsuccessfully to revive Osnes.  Osnes was pronounced dead on arrival at the hospital, and Jassy was arrested the next day, and charged with one count of murder, along with an additional count of assault with a deadly weapon. He remained in custody on $1 million bail, facing a possible life-with-parole prison term.

Trial and sentencing

The trial began on January 13, 2010. Jassy's attorney contended he was defending himself, his girlfriend, and his vehicle from "an angry drunk." The prosecution countered that Jassy was the aggressor. On February 1, 2010, he was convicted of second-degree murder but not guilty of assault with a deadly weapon and leaving the scene of an accident. On March 4, 2010 Jassy was sentenced to 15 years to life imprisonment. He was scheduled to be eligible for parole in 2024.  On March 27, 2020, California Governor Gavin Newsom commuted Jassy's sentence to time served and he was released from prison on parole.

Recordings under incarceration
The program known as Youthful Offender Program (or Y.O.P.) came about due to a change in U.S. legislation, allowing youthful offenders entering prison under the age of 22 that were supposed to go to level 4 high security prison for serving their sentences, were afforded an opportunity to be transferred to San Quentin prison which is a level 2 minimum security prison. Y.O.P. run by the California Department of Corrections and Rehabilitation (CDCR) also stipulated the creation of various programs to help in rehabilitation of offenders, with very positive results.

This prompted David Jassy already in San Quentin to volunteer in a musical program launched in 2015. Jassy's project "Y.O.P. Mixtape Program" tried to help young inmates through his own songwriting and record producing experience to allow the youth enrolled to record their own music in a studio inaugurated in the prison. Jassy explains that he grew up listening to rap and it affected his mood according to what rapper he was listening to. He encouraged the talented youth imprisoned on various offences to channel their feelings through music and lyrics they composed, thus serving as a rehabilitation and hopefully serve as a tool to help prevent other youth to fall into the same path through listening to a more genuine output of music from those actually incarcerated rather than the gangsta rappers they are accustomed to hear who just glorify prison life. Jassy also imposed a rule that in the recordings he would help in launching, no profanity would be allowed in the lyrics. From an initial mixtape project, the program developed into a more involved music mentorship program. Jassy says the mixtape released has caught the attention of music industry celebrities like Common and DJ Khaled, who are now supporters of the program.

Band Contagious
Jassy is part of the hip-hop band, Contagious, one of four official inmate music groups at San Quentin that perform at various yard shows, graduations and events inside the prison during the year. Jassy is the primary songwriter and front man of the band, that also includes convicted prisoners Paul Comauex (vocals), Lee Jaspar (on guitars), Kevin Sawyer (on keyboards) and James Benson (on drums). Contagious is under the supervision of prison staff and technician Raphaele Casale.

TEDxSanQuentin
In 2017, Jassy was invited to a special TEDx entitled TEDxSanQuentin. He performed during the event his own composition "Freedom" inspired by his own experience. Jassy wrote it when he was stuck in his cell during a lockdown at Solano Prison years earlier. Jassy’s son was in the audience. The filmed event was uploaded on April 20, 2017.

Productions
Jassy also worked on his own materials and released remixes including "Freedom" from The Game which he entitled "Freedom (Dreams Remix)". He also created beats for the acclaimed prison podcast Ear Hustle producing music from an influx of younger men who came into San Quentin.

Discography

Albums
Navigators
1999: Daily Life Illustrators (reached #27 on Swedish Albums Chart)
Track list:

Singles
Navigators
1998: "Come into My Life" (reached #31 on Swedish Singles Chart)
1998: "I Remember" (reached #46 on Swedish Singles Chart)
1999: "Superstar" (reached #20 on Swedish Singles Chart)

Solo
2009: "Exit"
2017: "Freedom" (released 13 May 2018)

Collaborations (albums / singles)
2004: "Blah Blah Blah" (single by Vanessa Struhler featuring David Jassy)
2007: "Be Good to Me" by Ashley Tisdale featuring David Jassy (taken from her album Headstrong)
 "Not Like That" (written by David Jassy produced by Twin)
2007: "Body Language" by Heidi Montag (written by David Jassy)
2008: Flashback (album by Darin Zanyar with six songs on the album written by David Jassy):
"Karma" (single written by and featuring David Jassy)
"Runaway" (single written by David Jassy)
"Strobelight", "Flashback", "Roadtrip" (other songs on album written by David Jassy)
2008: "Outta Control" by VFactory (written and featuring David Jassy)
2009: "Love Struck" by VFactory (written by David Jassy, Darin and produced by Swedish production team Twin)
2009: Guilty Pleasure, an album by Ashley Tisdale – album co-produced by David Jassy
"It's Alright, It's OK" (single from same album – song co-written by David Jassy)
"Crank It Up (second single includes vocals by David Jassy)
"Watcha Waitin For" (written by David Jassy produced by Twin)
 "Acting Out" (written by David Jassy and produced by Twin)
2009: "What If", an anti-bullying song by Friends featuring Darin (written by David Jassy and produced by Twin)
2009: "Got Skillz", "Pooltable","Okay" and "Match Made in Heaven" (Ilya featuring David Jassy)
2010: "Pyramid" by Charice featuring Iyaz (written by David Jassy produced by Twin)

References

External links

1974 births
Living people
21st-century Swedish male singers
People convicted of murder by California
Swedish songwriters
Swedish people convicted of murder
Swedish people imprisoned abroad
Swedish people of Estonian descent
Swedish people of Gambian descent
English-language singers from Sweden